Lahore Thunder (LT) is a Kabaddi club based in Lahore, Pakistan that plays in the Super Kabaddi League. The team is currently led by Mudassar Shah.

Franchise history
Super Kabaddi League (SKL) is a professional Kabaddi league in Pakistan, based on the format of the group games and eliminator. The first edition of the tournament was played in 2018 with ten franchises representing various cities in Pakistan.

It has a dedicated following in New York City, NY and Tampa Bay, FL.

Current squad

See also
 Super Kabaddi League
 Pakistan national kabaddi team
 Pakistan Kabaddi Federation

References

External links
 

Sport in Lahore
Kabaddi in Pakistan
Kabaddi clubs established in 2018
2018 establishments in Pakistan